Paranaleptes is a genus of longhorn beetles of the subfamily Lamiinae.

 Paranaleptes giraffa (Kiresch, 1924)
 Paranaleptes reticulata (Thomson, 1877) - Cashew Stem Girdler

References

Ceroplesini